The Good Lord Bird is a 2020 American historical drama miniseries, based on the 2013 novel of the same name by James McBride. Focusing on John Brown's attack on American slavery, the series was created and executive produced by Ethan Hawke and Mark Richard. Produced by Jason Blum, through Blumhouse Television, it premiered on October 4, 2020, on Showtime.

Premise
The series is told from the point of view of Henry "Onion" Shackleford (Joshua Caleb Johnson), a fictional enslaved boy, who is part of John Brown (Ethan Hawke) motley crew of abolitionist soldiers during the time of Bleeding Kansas, eventually participating in the famous 1859 raid on the Federal Armory at Harpers Ferry, Virginia (since 1863, West Virginia). Brown's raid failed to initiate a slave revolt as he intended, but it was one of the events that started the American Civil War.

It is not just the story of Brown but that of those that accompanied him. According to Hawke, "If you really study this character, he asks a lot of you philosophically. He challenges why so many of us accept the unacceptable". Author James McBride was involved in the production and according to him, "John Brown is a real hero to me and to many Black people who are no longer alive. John Brown gave his life and two of his sons' lives to the cause of freedom for Black people, and he started the Civil War. They buried this man's story for a long time....".

Cast

Main
 Ethan Hawke as John Brown
 Hubert Point-Du Jour as Bob
 Beau Knapp as Owen Brown
 Nick Eversman as John Brown Jr.
 Ellar Coltrane as Salmon Brown
 Jack Alcott as Jason Brown
 Mo Brings Plenty as Ottawa Jones
 Daveed Diggs as Frederick Douglass
 Joshua Caleb Johnson as Henry "Onion" Shackleford

Recurring 
 Wyatt Russell as First Lieutenant J. E. B. Stuart
 Rafael Casal as John Cook
 McKinley Belcher III as Broadnax
 Steve Zahn as Chase
 Victor Williams as Coachman Jim
 Quentin Plair as Emperor
 Miles Mussenden as Dangerfield Newby
 Ali Amin Carter as Lewis Leary
 Orlando Jones as Hayward Shepherd (The Rail Man)
 Brooks Ashmanskas as Lewis Washington

Guest 
 Zainab Jah as Harriet Tubman
 Maya Hawke as Annie Brown
 David Morse as Dutch Henry Sherman
 Alex Sharp as Preacher
 Gia Crovatin as Martha
 Killer Mike as Clarence
 Keith David as Herbert

Episodes

Music
Music in the miniseries is composed of Black musical genres: gospel, blues, and spirituals. Most is performed by Black artists or groups, with the theme song "Come On Children, Let's Sing", a gospel song, sung by Mahalia Jackson. Songs featured in the series include:
 Episode 1

 The Zion Travelers, "Am I a Soldier of the Lord?"
 Elmore James, "Shake Your Money Maker"
 The Zion Travelers, "The Blood"
 Mahalia Jackson, "I'm On My Way to Canaan"
 Episode 2

 Nina Simone, "I Shall Be Released"
 Shuggie Otis, "Sweet Thang"
 Episode 3

 Brother Joe May and the Bye & Bye, "Afterwhile"
 Shuggie Otis, "Sweet Thang"
 The Redemption Harmonizers, "Amazing Grace"
 Episode 4

 Elvis Presley, "Where Could I Go but to the Lord"
 Taj Mahal, "She Caught the Katy and Left Me the Mule to Ride"
 Episode 5

 The Ragged Jubilee, "In the Valley II"
 Joe and Eddie and the Les Braxter Chorus, "Michael, Row the Boat Ashore"
 Episode 6

 Mahalia Jackson, "Trouble of the World"
 Episode 7

 Spirit of Memphis Quartet, "Walking with Jesus"
 Cast, "Wayfaring Stranger"

Production

Development
Ethan Hawke and Jason Blum adapted the 2013 novel, The Good Lord Bird, for a limited series that premiered on October 4, 2020, on Showtime. The series was created and executive produced by Hawke and Mark Richard. Jason Blum, via Blumhouse Television, served as a production partner on the miniseries. Albert Hughes, Kevin Hooks, Darnell Martin, and Haifaa al-Mansour, Michael Nankin, and Kate Woods each directed an episode.

Casting
In August 2019, Daveed Diggs and Wyatt Russell signed on to portray Frederick Douglass and First Lieutenant J. E. B. Stuart. In July 2019, Joshua Caleb Johnson and Rafael Casal joined the cast as Henry "Onion" Shackleford and John Cook.

Filming
Principal photography for the series began in July 2019, in Powhatan, Virginia, near Richmond.

Reception

Critical response
For the series, review aggregator Rotten Tomatoes reported an approval rating of 98% based on 52 reviews, with an average rating of 8.5/10. The website's critics consensus reads, "Ethan Hawke dazzles in The Good Lord Bird, an epically irreverent adaptation that does right by its source material's good word." On Metacritic, the series has a weighted average score of 84 out of 100 based on reviews from 25 critics, indicating "universal acclaim."

In response to John Lahr's profile of Ethan Hawke, The New Yorker published a letter to the editor, written by Marty Brown, a descendant of John Brown. In the letter, Marty Brown welcomes the effort to bring John Brown's story to a wider audience but notes that his characterization in the series does not reflect the work of Brown's historians and biographers.

Accolades

References

Further reading

External links 
 
 

2020 American television series debuts
2020 American television series endings
2020s American drama television miniseries
Cultural depictions of Frederick Douglass
Cultural depictions of Harriet Tubman
Cultural depictions of John Brown (abolitionist)
English-language television shows
Peabody Award-winning television programs
Primetime Emmy Award-winning television series
Showtime (TV network) original programming
Television episodes about slavery in the United States
Television shows based on American novels
Television shows set in Kansas
Television shows set in Ontario
Television shows set in Virginia